John J. Sheridan is a lead character in the fictional universe of the science-fiction television series Babylon 5, played by Bruce Boxleitner. For most of the series, he is the commander of the Babylon 5 station; during the series' final season he is the President of the Interstellar Alliance.

Personality
John Sheridan is portrayed as an incorruptible, dynamic, idealistic, and charismatic leader who can inspire fierce loyalty in his subordinates. However, Sheridan is shown at times to be reckless and stubborn, and like his second-in-command Susan Ivanova he possesses a fierce temper that can lead to occasional explosive outbursts of anger. Fortunately, he tends to calm quickly and he usually demonstrates a cheerful and upbeat personality. His second wife, Anna Sheridan, was (apparently) killed while exploring a distant planet, and when he takes command of Babylon 5 at the start of Season 2 her death still troubles him.

After Sheridan's "return from the dead" in the fourth season, he displays an increasing impatience with accomplishing his goals. This is caused, however, by the fact that during season four, he learns that he has only twenty more years to live. By the end of the series Sheridan has become a galactic president and legend, and overall there is little doubt that he has been a force for good throughout his time in the series.

Religious references
Throughout the show numerous references are made concerning Sheridan's analogous role in history to that of a messiah. A number of religious phrases are used to refer to Sheridan: messiah, messianic, and The second coming. In Season four episode 17, The Face of the Enemy, when Michael Garibaldi speaks with William Edgars about capturing Sheridan, Garibaldi says "I don't know, but I think the last guy got 30 pieces of silver for the same job," a reference to Judas' betrayal of Jesus.

When Sheridan falls and is caught by the Vorlon Kosh in season 2 episode The Fall of Night. Kosh, not wanting to reveal his true form, appears as a different religious figure depending on the onlookers' homeworld. Because Sheridan is Human, he perceived him as being an angel.  says "To his heavenly messengers he will give orders about you, and with their hands, they will catch you." Which was the devil telling Jesus that if he were to fall, angels would catch him saving him from his death.

Sheridan was also resurrected twice by Lorien. The first time on Z'ha'dum in season four: Whatever Happened To Mr. Garibaldi, right after Sheridan asks Lorien "If I fall how will I know you'll catch me?", and the second was on Babylon 5 during a fight with Ulkesh in episode Falling Toward Apotheosis further solidifying his parallels with a mythical or historical messiah.

Character history

Early life and career
John Sheridan was born on Earth to an Earth Alliance diplomat. John Sheridan is a descendant of the famous American Civil War general Philip Sheridan. In the original broadcast of "And Now For a Word" Sheridan's middle name is given as David (his father's name, the name he eventually gives his son, and also the middle name of Jeffrey Sinclair). In later episodes, he is referred to as "John J. Sheridan". On the Babylon 5 season 2 DVD release of "And Now For a Word", Sheridan's name is corrected to "John J. Sheridan". As a young man he joined EarthForce, was married briefly to Elizabeth Lochley, and by 2245 had risen to the rank of lieutenant commander.

In the TV-movie In the Beginning he was offered the first officer position aboard the EarthForce warship Prometheus. The Prometheus later was the ship that precipitated the Earth-Minbari War when it fired on a Minbari warcruiser during Earth's disastrous first contact with that race. During the war Sheridan served as first officer aboard the "Hyperion-Class" warship EAS Lexington. When the ship's captain was killed in an ambush by the Minbari flagship Black Star, Sheridan took command of the Lexington. With the Lexington crippled and unable to fight, Sheridan mined several nearby asteroids with nuclear weapons and lured the Black Star back towards his ship with a distress signal. He then detonated the nuclear mines, destroying the Black Star and giving Earth its only real victory in the war. The infuriated Minbari nicknamed Sheridan the "Starkiller." For his action Sheridan was awarded the EarthForce Silver Star and he became one of the few human heroes to survive the war.

Following the war, Sheridan was promoted to the rank of Captain and given command of the EAS Agamemnon in the mid-2250s.  The Agamemnon was one of the new "Omega-Class" destroyers which were much larger and more powerful than the older "Hyperion-Class" warships. Sheridan spent the next few years leading the Agamemnon in exploratory and diplomatic missions. He was one of the candidates to command Babylon 5, but was rejected by the Minbari in favor of Jeffrey Sinclair. However, Earth Alliance President Santiago had kept him as his first choice in the event something happened to Sinclair. Also perhaps around that time, he remarried this time to Anna Sheridan, who had been a close friend of his sister Elizabeth Sheridan.

At some unknown point in his career, Sheridan played a major role in quelling the Mars Riots, something which proved to be a significant sore spot a number of years later between himself and the Mars Rebellion when he offered them independence in exchange for their assistance in overthrowing President Clark's regime.

Season 2
When Commander Jeffrey Sinclair was reassigned as ambassador to Minbar in January 2259, Sheridan was chosen to command Babylon 5. Sheridan was initially not well received by the Minbari, and was still called "Starkiller" by many in the warrior caste (referring to the engagement in which the Black Star was destroyed). Soon after his arrival, in "Points of Departure," the Minbari ship Trigati, which had disappeared during the Battle of the Line, reappeared and tried to provoke him into firing upon them. However, Sheridan remained cool and defused the situation. Even with the strained relations with the Minbari, Delenn and Sheridan began to develop a close friendship. Sheridan also had some initial doubts about taking command of Babylon 5 because he feared being turned into a bureaucrat, but after helping to rescue the EAS Cortez, commanded by his friend Captain Maynard, after an accident in hyperspace, he realized he was in the right place.

Sheridan soon discovered that Earth Alliance President Clark was slowly turning the Earth Alliance into a dictatorship. Sheridan found that the Nightwatch, an SA-like organization, had recruited much of the station's security.

Soon into the season, it became known that the Shadows had returned and were beginning to move again, and even covertly aided the Centauri in defeating the Narn. When Sheridan attempted to aid a Narn vessel, the Centauri attacked Babylon 5, forcing him to destroy a Centauri warship. Given the choice of either apologizing to the Centauri or losing his command, Sheridan decided to apologize. A group of Centauri civilians attempted to assassinate Sheridan, but he was saved by Vorlon Ambassador Kosh and the formality of the apology was dismissed in view of this event. After the fall of Narn, Minbari Ambassador Delenn revealed the existence of the Rangers to Sheridan, and offered him shared command of the Rangers on Babylon 5. Sheridan vowed that the Rangers would hold the line against the darkness, no matter what the cost.

Season 3
At the beginning of the third season, Sheridan was presented with the prototype Minbari White Star class spacecraft. On his first mission in command of White Star One, he helped Rangers stationed at a training camp under Centauri blockade escape before being captured by the Shadows. At the same time, he had to keep an Earth Alliance official snooping around the station unaware of that mission, and his knowledge of the Shadow's involvement.

In the episode "Voices of Authority" proof surfaced that Clark had arranged for the late President Santiago's assassination. When Sheridan found that Clark's administration was attempting to adapt Shadow technology from a vessel unearthed beneath the surface of Ganymede, in Messages from Earth, he destroyed the vessel rather than allowing it to fall into their hands. This led to Clark declaring martial law throughout the Earth Alliance. After martial law was declared, Sheridan defeated the Nightwatch forces by luring them into a trap.

The EAS Alexander, under the command of General William Hague, was leading the efforts against Clark. Hague was killed in an attack on the Alexander, but the ship escaped and reached Babylon 5. The EAS Churchill joined the Alexander at Babylon 5. The Churchill brought information that an attack force was a few hours away, and that the force was coming to arrest Sheridan and his staff.

Mars had decided not to implement martial law. In response Clark ordered his forces to bomb civilian targets on Mars. In response, Proxima 3 and Orion 7 seceded from the Earth Alliance. In "Severed Dreams" Sheridan joined them and declared Babylon 5's own secession. Very soon after Sheridan's declaration, an attack force arrived consisting of two Omega-class destroyers and several escorts. Clark's attack force was soon defeated at Babylon 5. Unfortunately, the reinforcements for Clark's attack force then arrived. Sheridan realizing that his position was hopeless was prepared to accept defeat, but at that moment Delenn came to his rescue, leading several Minbari War Cruisers to the station, while herself commanding White Star One. When told by the EarthForce ships to leave or they would engage her fleet, Delenn answered:

Realizing the situation, the EarthForce reinforcements turned around and withdrew.

In the episode "War Without End" Sheridan learned that he had a role to play in the disappearance of Babylon 4. Sheridan, Delenn, Marcus Cole, Ambassador Sinclair, Lennier, and Ivanova went back in time to intercept Shadow allies who were on their way to destroy that station. In a mishap, Sheridan was flung seventeen years into the future. He found himself on a devastated Centauri Prime, about to be put to death by Emperor Mollari. During this time he also learned that he had married Delenn and had a son, David. Instead of an execution, Mollari let them go. While on the way to the ship, Sheridan was pulled back into time, and back to Babylon 4. They were then able to send Babylon 4 into the distant past where it was used to fight in the first Shadow war. Sinclair stayed on board, and transformed himself into the Minbari religious figure Valen.

In Minbari culture, there are three castes: Worker, Warrior and Religious. Sheridan married three women, and while only one was Minbari, each represented a different caste: Anna (Worker), Elizabeth (Warrior) and Delenn (Religious).

For the remainder of 2260, Sheridan's attention was directed mainly against the Shadows and the upcoming war. He began to build up an alliance of races for the larger fight. Sheridan then led a large multi-species attack force against the Shadows. While the force was able to drive them off, the allies lost far many more ships than they had hoped. For every Shadow vessel they killed, two of their ships had been destroyed.

The Shadows found that Sheridan's wife Anna was still alive, and that she was acting as the CPU for a Shadow vessel. The Shadows pulled her out as soon as they made the connection between her and Sheridan. Because of her time in the Shadow vessel, her original personality had died. A new personality had developed, which was totally loyal to the Shadows. They then sent Anna to Babylon 5 to bring Sheridan to them on Z'ha'dum.

Sheridan was once told by Kosh that if he went to Z'ha'dum he would die. During his vision of the future, that version of Delenn told him not to go to Z'ha'dum; also during the vision, Centauri Prime had been devastated. He began thinking that originally perhaps he had listened to Delenn and did not go to Z'ha'dum. He reasoned that if he did go to Z'ha'dum that the vision of the future he had seen would not occur. So he accompanied Anna on the White Star to Z'ha'dum. What he did not tell her or anyone else was that he had Garibaldi hide two very large fusion bombs on to the ship. A group of Shadow Vessels had surrounded Babylon 5.  At that time, Delenn was listening to a recording that he made. Sheridan explained his reasons for going to Z'ha'dum in the recording, and told her that he loved her.

While on Z'ha'dum, the Shadows attempted to lure Sheridan to their side. Sheridan refused to cooperate. Sheridan escaped from the Shadows momentarily and went to a balcony overlooking their capital city. Anna tried one more time to get Sheridan to cooperate with the Shadows. He refused, ordering the White Star to crash into the city; the resulting over 1 gigaton nuclear explosion destroyed the capital city. Meanwhile Sheridan, about to be killed by the explosion, jumped off the balcony into a pit that was miles deep after hearing the voice of Ambassador Kosh instructing him to do so.

When the capital city was destroyed, the Shadow vessels left Babylon 5. Sheridan's colleagues realized that he was now dead.

Season 4
At the start of the fourth season, the Shadows were still recovering from the destruction of their capital city. The alliance made by Sheridan had started to fall apart. Many governments felt that if they did nothing the Shadows would leave them alone. During this time, Delenn began to organize a large Anla'Shok attack on Z'ha'dum.

Meanwhile, on Z'ha'dum, somehow Sheridan had survived the fall and was trapped between life and death. He met Lorien, who was the first and oldest sentient being in the galaxy. Lorien tried to talk him into letting go, that no matter how important the cause, that death could ultimately not be denied. Sheridan learned to let go of the world of the living, but he could not let go of Delenn. Lorien was able to help bring him back from the dead by giving him some of his own life force, extending Sheridan's life by approximately twenty Earth years.

In "The Summoning" some of the alien ambassadors had arranged a protest on the Zocalo against Delenn's attack. When some bystanders tried to attack Delenn, the situation began to degenerate into a large fight. All fighting ceased when Sheridan entered the Zocalo. When an Ambassador said that they all thought he was dead, Sheridan replied by saying, "I was. I'm better now." Sheridan convinced the Ambassadors to help build the largest fleet ever assembled. The hostile mob was forged into a cheering crowd ready to follow Sheridan.

Finally Sheridan confronted the Shadows and Vorlons. With Delenn, he led the alliance of Humans, Narns, Minbari, and the League of Non-Aligned Worlds, known as the Army of Light, against the Shadows. In "Into the Fire," at the Battle of Coriana VI, Lorien confronted the Shadows and Vorlons telling them they must depart with the last of the First Ones "beyond the rim" of the galaxy.

Sheridan has made use of nuclear devices on at least four separate occasions: against the Minbari flagship, the Black Star; at Z'ha'dum; at Coriana 6; and again during the events of Thirdspace. Bruce Boxleitner has consequently referred to his character as "John 'Nuke 'em' Sheridan".

When Earth Force ships destroyed five refugee ships carrying 2,000 civilians per ship, Sheridan began a campaign to topple Clark's administration. He first led a task force to Proxima III to break the blockade of the planet. Following the breaking of that blockade, Sheridan then headed towards Earth. Sheridan's old ship, the Agamemnon, showed up and joined with his forces. While touring the Agamemnon, Sheridan received a message from Michael Garibaldi that his father had been captured by Clark's forces, and asked him to come to Mars. Garibaldi, under the PsiCop Alfred Bester's influence, had set a trap for Sheridan. Immediately after arriving on Mars, Sheridan was captured by Clark's forces. In the episode "Intersections in Real Time" he was interrogated and tortured by Earth Force interrogators. Sheridan was able to successfully resist them despite intensive drug and psychological pressure. After Bester released Garibaldi from his telepathic conditioning, Sheridan was rescued.

The White Star fleet encounters a battle group of Advanced Destroyers (sent to engage the regular break-away Earthforce Alliance Destroyers), enhanced with Shadow technology. Susan Ivanova is mortally wounded when her command ship, the White Star 2, collides with debris from one of the destroyed enemy vessels “Between The Darkness And The Light”.

In the episode "Endgame" Sheridan was able to use telepaths to disable most of the loyalist Earthforce Alliance ships, stationed at Mars - this saved many thousands of lives on both sides. Sheridan then took the fleet to Earth. Seeing that their fortunes had changed, the resistance on Earth went to arrest Clark, but Clark committed suicide before he could be captured, but not before he had input codes to the Earth defense network satellites, causing them to turn their weapons against the planet. All warships: loyalist, break-away & alien support vessels combine to destroy the satellites and finally end the threat to Earth.

Under political pressure from the remnants of the Earth Alliance government, Sheridan resigned his EarthForce commission. In the episode "Rising Star" Clark's successor President Luchenko offered amnesty for all who followed Sheridan, as well as allowing Sheridan to retain his military pension and leave with full honors. The next day, the President gave a press conference.

During that same press conference Delenn and G'Kar addressed the gathering. It was at this press conference that she announced that the members of the League of Non-Aligned Worlds had voted to dissolve that body, and enter into a new Interstellar Alliance. To the shock of the Earth Alliance government, Sheridan was named the first President of the Interstellar Alliance. Sheridan and Delenn returned to Babylon 5. The couple were married at this time.

Season 5
After returning to Babylon 5, President Sheridan began the process of leading the new Interstellar Alliance. The first years of the Alliance would bring about numerous problems that would shake the Alliance to its core. Sheridan had to work to keep the Alliance together, despite forces that were working to tear it apart. President Sheridan brought Captain Elizabeth Lochley to the station to take command. Even though Sheridan described her as Ivanova's replacement, she was really a replacement for the both of them. Lt. Corwin took over some of Ivanova's other duties. Sheridan gave her a free hand to run the station's affairs, reserving only the political course of the Alliance to himself.

In the episode "No Compromises," Sheridan began preparing for his formal inauguration. At about the same time he had to deal with the first assassination attempt to be made against him. A telepath saved Sheridan from being shot. The inauguration ceremony was moved to the observation dome.

After his inauguration, Sheridan gave shelter to a group of refugee telepaths led by a man named Byron, and allowed them to form a colony on Babylon 5. He felt that with Psi-Corps preparing to eventually overthrow the government that it would be beneficial to have telepaths friendly to the Alliance. This helped end the harassment of the  - who were being bombed to the point of extinction by the raiders. Afterwards, Sheridan took the opportunity to let Garibaldi form a covert intelligence unit with several of these telepaths.

PsiCop Bester came to the station with the intention of taking the telepaths back to Earth. His group managed to arrest all the telepaths, and were about to depart. But Captain Lochley and Dr. Franklin came up with a way to delay the removal of the telepaths. Dr. Franklin found that he had the right to quarantine newly arrived people for two months, and Lochley backed him up. This gave the telepaths a respite in order to figure out a long term solution.

In "Secrets of the Soul", Byron decided to demand that the telepaths be given a home world. Byron had his telepaths spy on the various ambassadors, and learn secrets from them. In an Alliance meeting, Byron made his demand, and revealed that they had spied on the ambassadors. The PsiCops arrived soon afterwards to disband the telepath colony, and take the telepaths back to Earth. Despite attempts by Sheridan to seek a peaceful resolution to the crisis, the PsiCops insisted. Byron and a small group of telepaths committed suicide rather than allow Bester to take them back into Psi-Corps control.

Later years
Sheridan led the Alliance from Babylon 5 for the first year. When the Alliance headquarters in the Minbari city of Tuzanor were complete, Sheridan moved to Minbar. He led the Alliance from there for over a decade. Just before moving to Minbar, Sheridan and Delenn learned that Delenn was pregnant. Despite the fact that the baby's human heritage could lead to danger, Delenn was able to carry the baby to term. The couple named their son David.

In Babylon 5: A Call to Arms, five years after the founding of the Alliance, Sheridan would overlook the construction of the Victory-class ship, which was a Destroyer Class White Star. While he was overseeing the ship's development, Galen, a technomage contacted John and warning him that the Drahk were returning to exact revenge against the Alliance in a big show of force by wiping out Earth's population with a Shadow Planet Killer which was the last type of its weapon known to exist in the galaxy after their masters, The Shadows left beyond the rim.  John in the Victory-class ship, the Excalibur, with the Alliance fleet destroyed the planet killer, but much to John's horror, he and the rest of the Alliance fleet witnessed the Drahk Fleet drop a biological weapon into Earth's atmosphere. A weapon that within five years would wipe out all life on the surface. Sheridan commissioned the Excalibur to assemble a crew and go on a mission to save Earth.

In Babylon 5: The Lost Tales, while en route to Babylon 5 for a celebration of the Alliance's 10 year anniversary, Sheridan met Vintari, the son of the notorious Centauri emperor Cartagia. In a dream, the technomage Galen warned him that in thirty years Vintari would launch a terrible military campaign to destroy Earth, and only his death at Sheridan's hands could stop him for sure. Sheridan chose a different path, allowing Vintari to fly in a Starfury beside him as he had always dreamed, and inviting him to stay in the Alliance's headquarters, safe from assassination attempts which were becoming increasingly common in the Centauri royal court. In this way, he hoped to show Vintari the concept of kindness for its own sake, rather than the quid pro quo nature of assistance common on Centauri Prime. In 2279, Sheridan declined reelection to the Presidency. His wife Delenn became the second President of the Alliance, while Sheridan turned his efforts to leading the Anla'Shok.

In the final episode, "Sleeping in Light", set in the year 2281, Sheridan knew that the 20 years he had been given by Lorien were almost over. He had his friends - Ivanova, Garibaldi, Franklin, and Centauri Emperor Cotto - come to his home for one last reunion. Just before their meeting, Franklin found that Sheridan only had a short time left. The next morning, Sheridan left his home and his wife for the last time. He traveled alone to Babylon 5 to see the station one last time. He learned that the station was about to be shut down and demolished. Zack Allan - who had also been invited to the reunion but hadn't received the invitation - visited Sheridan. Sheridan learned that Allan had re-enlisted a few months ago and returned to Babylon 5, which resulted in the Ranger carrying his invitation being unable to find him on Earth. Sheridan realized that he was coming to the end. He then traveled alone to Coriana 6, where he was taken beyond the galactic rim by Lorien. His empty ship was later recovered, but his body was never found. Some Minbari believed that he would eventually return, but neither his friends nor his family ever saw him again.

Reception and literary analysis 
John Sheridan as a literary character has been subject to several literary analysis, for example as a hero and as a leader.

References

External links 
 Character profile on World of JMS

Babylon 5 characters
Fictional military strategists
Fictional military captains
Fictional politicians
Fictional heads of state
Television characters introduced in 1994

ru:Список персонажей телесериала «Вавилон-5»#Джон Шеридан